The Volksgarten is a public park in the Innere Stadt first district of Vienna, Austria. The garden, which is part of the Hofburg Palace, was laid out by Ludwig Remy in 1821. The park was built over the city fortifications that were destroyed by Napoleon in 1809. The Volksgarten was opened to the public in 1823.

History
The Volksgarten area was originally used for fortifications. Between 1596 and 1597, a fortress wall was built on the eastern side of park. In 1639, additional fortifications were built on the southern side. In 1809, these fortifications were destroyed by Napoleon's French troops.

Between 1817 and 1821, the area near Ballhausplatz square was converted to gardens originally intended for a private garden for the archdukes. These plans were changed through a proposal by the court garden administration to turn the area into the first public park in the city. On 1 March 1823, the park was officially opened. Starting in 1825, the name Volksgarten was commonly used. In 1862, the gardens were extended toward Ringstraße after the city moat had been filled in.

Buildings

At the center of the park stands the neoclassical Theseus Temple by Pietro di Nobile, completed in 1821. This small-scale replica of the Temple of Hephaestus in Athens was originally designed to house Antonio Canova's Theseus sculpture. Canova was also involved in the construction of the temple. In 1890, Canova's sculpture was moved to the Museum of Fine Arts.

The Cortisches coffee house was built between 1820 and 1823, also by Peter Nobile. Austrian Romantic composers Johann Strauss I and Joseph Lanner performed here.

The Cafè Meierei was built in 1890, originally as a water reservoir. In 1924, it was converted to the Milchtrinkhalle. The Milchpavillon was built in 1951 by Oswald Haerdtl.

Monuments

At the northern end of the park stands the Empress Elizabeth Monument by Hans Bitterlich and Friedrich Ohmann, completed in 1907. At the center of the monument is a statue of a seated Empress Elisabeth by Hans Bitterlich. The statue of the empress, which was sculpted from an 8000–kg block of Laaser marble, measures 2.5 m in height. The dedication of the monument took place on 4 June 1907 in the presence of Emperor Franz Joseph I of Austria.

At the southern end of the park stands the Franz Grillparzer Monument by Carl Kundmann, completed in 1875. The seated figure of Austrian writer Franz Grillparzer is shown in contemplation holding a book in his left hand.

Fountains
The Volksgarten contains two fountains. The Triton and Nymph Fountain was built in 1880 by Viktor Tilgner. People's Garten Fountain was erected in 1866 by Anton Dominik Fernkorn.

Rose Garden
The park is famous for its beautiful rose gardens with over 3,000 rose bushes of about 400 different cultivars of roses.

Gallery

References
Citations

Bibliography

External links

 Encyclopedia of Austria

Parks in Vienna
Innere Stadt